The 1994 United States Senate election in Nevada was held November 8, 1994. Incumbent Democrat Richard Bryan won re-election to a second term. This was the last time a Democrat won Nevada's Class 1 Senate Seat until Jacky Rosen was elected to it in 2018.

Democratic primary

Candidates 
 Richard Bryan, incumbent U.S. Senator

Results 
Bryan was unopposed in the Democratic primary.

Republican primary

Candidates 
 Hal Furman, former Principal Deputy Assistant Secretary of the Interior for Water and Science and former legislative counsel to U.S. Senator Paul Laxalt
 Charles Woods

Results

General election

Candidates 
 Richard Bryan (D), incumbent U.S. Senator
 Hal Furman (R), former Principal Deputy Assistant Secretary of the Interior for Water and Science and former legislative counsel to U.S. Senator Paul Laxalt

Results

See also 
 1994 United States Senate elections

References 

Nevada
1994
1994 Nevada elections